Marilou Berry (born 1 February 1983) is a French actress, film director and screenwriter. She is well known for her roles in Look at Me (2004), Vilaine (2008) and The New Adventures of Cinderella (2017).

Personal life

Marilou Berry was born on 1 February 1983, the daughter of filmmaker Josiane Balasko (née Balašković) and sculptor Philippe Berry (né Benguigui), and the niece of actor Richard Berry. Her mother is of Croatian descent, whereas her father is of Maghrebi Jewish descent. Uninterested in school studies, she left high school and enrolled at the Conservatoire de Paris.

From 2007 to 2010, Berry dated the actor David Rousseau. In 2011, she began a relationship with the young entrepreneur Arnaud Schneider. They separated in January 2017. On 9 June 2017, she was seen during the French Open, with her new boyfriend, Alexis. In July 2018, she announced on her Instagram that she was pregnant with her first child.

Berry’s father, Philippe, died suddenly on 5 September 2019 at the age of 63.

Life and career

Berry made her first appearance on the screen at 8 years old in My Life Is Hell, a comedy directed, written and produced by her mother and co-starring her uncle, Richard Berry.

Berry has had several roles in films as a teenager who finds her salvation in music. 
As Lolita Cassard in Look at Me (2003), she was a girl crushed by the notoriety of her father, an author, while trying to get him to notice her singing talent. As Hannah Goldman in The first time I turned 20 (2004), she was the only girl in a traditionally all-male school jazz band in 1950s France.

Berry's most recent roles have been comedic, such as Once Upon a Time in the Oued and then Nos jours heureux (Our Happy Days), as well as in the upcoming The New Adventures of Cinderella.

Filmography

Actress

Director / Writer

Dubbing

Theatre

Decorations 
 Chevalier of the Order of Arts and Letters (2016)

References

External links

 

French film actresses
1983 births
Living people
21st-century French actresses
Actresses from Paris
Conservatoire de Paris alumni
French people of Croatian descent
French people of Jewish descent
Most Promising Actress Lumières Award winners
20th-century French actresses
French stage actresses
French television actresses
Chevaliers of the Ordre des Arts et des Lettres
French film directors
French women film directors
French women screenwriters
French screenwriters
Jewish French actresses
Maghrebi Jews